John Sheridan (born September 18, 1954 in Minneapolis, Minnesota) is a retired professional ice hockey player who played 69 games in the World Hockey Association.  He played for the Indianapolis Racers. Sheridan was selected by the Minnesota North Stars in round 6 (96th overall),  of the 1974 NHL Amateur Draft and by the Indianapolis Racers in round 7 (92nd overall) of the 1974 WHA Amateur Draft after his freshman year at University of Minnesota.

Sheridan also played in other various professional leagues, including the NAHL, IHL, PHL, NEHL/EHL, and the ACHL until his retirement in 
1982.  Following his retirement, he helped create Mohawk Valley Community College's first junior college hockey program in Utica, NY.  He was their first coach from 1983 through 1991.  His record there was 59-66-0.

Sheridan currently resides in the Greater Cleveland area and is the head coach for his city's High School Hockey team.

External links

1954 births
American men's ice hockey centers
Ice hockey people from Minneapolis
Minnesota Golden Gophers men's ice hockey players
Indianapolis Racers draft picks
Indianapolis Racers players
Living people
Minnesota North Stars draft picks
NCAA men's ice hockey national champions